Events in the year 1928 in Brazil.

Incumbents

Federal government 
 President: Washington Luís 
 Vice President: Fernando de Melo Viana

Governors 
 Alagoas: 
 till 7 June: Pedro da Costa Rego 
 7 June-12 June: José Julio Cansanção
 from 12 June: Álvaro Correia Pais
 Amazonas: Ifigênio Ferreira de Sales
 Bahia: Góis Calmon (till 18 March); Vital Soares (from 19 March)
 Ceará: José Moreira da Rocha (till 19 May); Eduardo Henrique Girão (19 May - 12 July); José Carlos de Matos Peixoto (from 12 July)
 Goiás: Brasil Caiado
 Maranhão: José Magalhães de Almeida
 Mato Grosso: Mário Correia da Costa
 Minas Gerais: Antônio Carlos Ribeiro de Andrada
 Pará: Dionísio Bentes
 Paraíba: 
 till 22 October: João Suassuna
 from 22 October: João Pessoa Cavalcanti
 Paraná: Caetano Munhoz da Rocha; Afonso Camargo
 Pernambuco: Estácio Coimbra
 Piauí:
 till 1 July: Matias Olímpio de Melo
 from 1 July: João de Deus Pires Leal
 Rio Grande do Norte: Juvenal Lamartine de Faria
 Rio Grande do Sul: Antônio Augusto Borges de Medeiros (till 25 January); Getúlio Dornelles Vargas (from 25 January)
 Santa Catarina:
 São Paulo: Júlio Prestes
 Sergipe:

Vice governors 
 Rio Grande do Norte:
 São Paulo:

Events 
22 July - The Estádio Parque São Jorge football stadium in São Paulo is inaugurated.
10 August - The ETA – Empresa de Transporte Aéreo airline is founded; it remains in operation for only a year.
3 December - Disaster of the Dornier J 'Santos Dumont'. 
date unknown - The Liberator Party (Brazil) is founded for the first time, by members of the Rio Grande do Sul Federalist Party, notably Joaquim Francisco de Assis Brasil.

Arts and culture

Books
Mário de Andrade - Macunaíma
Oswald de Andrade - Manifesto Antropófago

Births 
6 January - Carlos Manga, film director (died 2015)
1 March - Maurício do Valle, actor (died 1994)
13 March - Paulo Ribenboim, mathematician
19 March - Dequinha, footballer (died 1997)
23 April - Martim Francisco, association football coach (died 1982)
1 May 
 Delfim Netto, economist, Minister of Finance, Agriculture and Planning of Brazil, professor and congressman
 Marcelo Pinto Carvalheira, Roman Catholic archbishop (died 2017)
11 May - Dulce Figueiredo,  wife of future Brazilian president João Figueiredo (died 2011)
21 June – Fiorella Mari, Brazilian-Italian actress
24 July – Jardel Filho, actor (died 1983)
13 August – Pedro Pedrossian, politician (died 2017)
15 August – Manfredo do Carmo, mathematician (died 2018)
24 September - Aldo Vannucchi, academic
22 October - Nelson Pereira dos Santos, film director (died 2018)

Deaths 
30 June - Landell de Moura, Roman Catholic priest and inventor (born 1861)

References

See also 
1928 in Brazilian football

 
1920s in Brazil
Years of the 20th century in Brazil
Brazil
Brazil